Clouds in My Head is the debut album by Norwegian jazz bassist and composer Arild Andersen recorded in 1975 and released on the ECM label.

Reception
The Allmusic review awarded the album 3 stars.

Track listing
All compositions by Arild Andersen
 "305 W 18 St" - 3:49   
 "Last Song" - 3:09   
 "Outhouse" - 7:49   
 "Song for a Sad Day" - 7:02   
 "Clouds in My Head" - 3:26   
 "Cycles" - 6:14   
 "SIV" - 3:34   
 "The Sword Under His Wings" - 9:44   
Recorded at Arne Bendiksen Studio in Oslo, Norway in February 1975

Personnel
Arild Andersen - bass
Knut Riisnæs - tenor saxophone, soprano saxophone, flute
Jon Balke - piano 
Pål Thowsen - drums

References

ECM Records albums
Arild Andersen albums
1975 albums
Albums produced by Manfred Eicher